The 46th ceremony of the People's Choice Awards was held on November 15, 2020, to honor the best in popular culture for 2020. The show was hosted by Demi Lovato and was broadcast live by E! at the Barker Hangar in Santa Monica, California. The show had a 43% jump in viewership from the year prior and received generally good ratings from the viewers.

Performances
 Justin Bieber"Lonely" (with Benny Blanco), "Holy"
 Chloe x Halle"Ungodly Hour"

Presenters
Presenters were announced on November 14, 2020, the day before the ceremony.
 Demi Lovatomain show host
 Jameela Jamilpresented The Female Movie Star of 2020
 Christina Hendrickspresented The Drama TV Star of 2020
 Bebe Rexhapresented The Daytime Talk Show of 2020
 Addison Raepresented The Country Artist of 2020
 Tyler, the Creatorpresented Fashion Icon of 2020 to Tracee Ellis Ross
 Mario Lopez & Elizabeth Berkley Laurenpresented The Nighttime Talk Show of 2020
 Alison Briepresented The Male Artist of 2020 and introduced Justin Bieber
 Armie Hammerpresented People's Icon of 2020 to Jennifer Lopez
 Karamo Brownpresented The Female TV Star of 2020
 Tiffany Haddishpresented People's Champion of 2020 to Tyler Perry
 Machine Gun Kellypresented The Comedy Movie Star of 2020

Winners and nominees
The nominees were announced in October 1.

Winners are listed first and are in bold.

Film

TV

Music

Pop culture

Other

People's Icon of 2020
 Jennifer Lopez

People's Champion of 2020
 Tyler Perry

Fashion Icon of 2020
 Tracee Ellis Ross

References

November 2020 events in the United States
2020 awards in the United States
2020 film awards
2020 music awards
2020 television awards
2020 in Los Angeles County, California
People's Choice Awards